Mark Ford (born 1962 Nairobi, Kenya) is a British poet. He currently serves as the Head of the Department of English Language and Literature at University College London.

Life
Mark was born in Nairobi, Kenya on the 24th June, 1962 to Donald and Mary Ford. He went to school in London, and attended Oxford University and, as a Kennedy Scholar, Harvard University. He studied for his doctorate at Oxford University on the poetry of John Ashbery, and has published widely on nineteenth- and twentieth-century American writing, including on Raymond Roussel. From 1991-1993 he was Visiting Lecturer at Kyoto University in Japan.

He is Professor of English in the Department of English Language and Literature at University College London.

He is a regular contributor to the New York Review of Books, Times Literary Supplement, and the London Review of Books.

Helen Vendler compared him with John Ashbery.

Works

Poetry
 Landlocked (Chatto & Windus, 1992; 1998)
 Soft Sift (Faber & Faber, 2001/Harcourt Brace, 2003).
 Six Children (Faber & Faber, 2011).
 Selected Poems (Coffee House Press, 2014)

Prose
 A Driftwood Altar (Waywiser Press, 2006).
 Mr and Mrs Stevens and Other Essays (Peter Lang, 2011).

Anthologies
 New Chatto Poets: Number Two (Chatto & Windus, 1989).
 London: A History in Verse (The Belknap Press of Harvard University Press, 2012).

Biography
 Raymond Roussel and the Republic of Dreams (Faber & Faber, 2001).

Translation
 New Impressions of Africa (Princeton University Press, 2011).

Criticism
 Something we have that they don't: British & American poetic relations since 1925 (University of Iowa Press, 2004).
 This Dialogue of One: Essays on Poets from John Donne to Joan Murray (Eyewear Publishing, 2014).

References

External links
Podcast Interview with Ford by André Naffis-Sahely

1962 births
20th-century British poets
Writers from Nairobi
Kenyan poets
Kenyan male writers
Harvard University alumni
Kennedy Scholarships
Academic staff of Kyoto University
Living people
British male poets
21st-century British poets
21st-century British male writers
20th-century British male writers